The UK Albums Chart is one of many music charts compiled by the Official Charts Company that calculates the best-selling albums of the week in the United Kingdom. Before 2004, the chart was only based on the sales of physical albums. This list shows albums that peaked in the Top 10 of the UK Albums Chart during 1999, as well as albums which peaked in 1998 and 2000 but were in the top 10 in 1999. The entry date is when the album appeared in the top ten for the first time (week ending, as published by the Official Charts Company, which is six days after the chart is announced).

The first new number-one album of the year was You've Come a Long Way, Baby by Fatboy Slim. Overall, fifteen different albums peaked at number-one in 1999, with fifteen unique artists hitting that position.

Background

Best-selling albums
Shania Twain had the best-selling album of the year with Come On Over. By Request by Boyzone came in second place. The Man Who by Travis, ABBA Gold: Greatest Hits by ABBA and Performance and Cocktails by Stereophonics made up the top five. Albums by Robbie Williams, Steps, The Corrs, Westlife and Macy Gray were also in the top-ten best selling albums of the year.

Top-ten albums
Key

See also
1999 in British music
List of number-one albums from the 1990s (UK)

References
General

Specific

External links
1999 album chart archive at the Official Charts Company (click on relevant week)

United Kingdom top 10 albums
Top 10 albums
1999